The 2016 Women's Water Polo Olympic Qualification Tournament was held at the Groenhovenbad in Gouda, Netherlands, from 21 to 28 March 2016. The top four teams advanced to the Olympics. The mascot of the event was an orange lion in blue clothes called Swimba.

Participants

There were 12 places originally allocated to continental associations in the tournament not already directly qualified to the Olympics – 7 from Europe, 2 from the Americas, 1 from Asia, 1 from Africa, and 1 from Oceania.

Squads

Draw
The draw took place on 23 January 2016 in Belgrade, after the final of the 2016 European Championship.

Preliminary round
All times are local (UTC+1).

Group A

Group B

Knockout stage
Times are local (UTC+1) for matches on 26 March, and (UTC+2) for matches on 27 and 28 March 2016.

Bracket

5th place bracket

Quarterfinals
The winners qualify for the 2016 Olympics.

5–8th place semifinals

Semifinals

7th place match

5th place match

3rd place match

Final

Final ranking

See also
2016 Men's Water Polo Olympic Games Qualification Tournament

References

External links
Official website

Qualification Tournament, women
2016
Qualification for the 2016 Summer Olympics
Olymp
2016 in Dutch sport
Sports competitions in South Holland
Sport in Gouda, South Holland